Cimatti is a surname. Notable people with the surname include:

Marco Cimatti (191?–1982), Italian cyclist
Maria Raffaella Cimatti (1861–1945), Italian nurse
Vincent Cimatti (1871–1965), Italian Roman Catholic priest

Italian-language surnames